Grant Langston (born 17 June 1982), is a South African former professional motocross racer. He competed in the Motocross World Championships from 1998 to 2000 and in the AMA Motocross Championships from 2001 to 2008. He was the 2000 125cc motocross world champion and the AMA 450MX national champion in 2007.

Biography
Born in Durban, South Africa, Langston began competing in the world championships in 1998, and by 2000, he had won the F.I.M. 125cc world championship as a member of the KTM factory racing team. He moved to the United States in 2001 to compete in the A.M.A. national championships, winning the 2003 A.M.A 125cc outdoor title and the 2003 AMA Supermoto Unlimited Championship. He also won A.M.A 125 supercross championships in 2005 and 2006. In 2007, Langston won the A.M.A. national championship in the Motocross Class for 450cc machines, riding for Yamaha. 

Langston's racing career was cut short due to a cancerous tumor in his eye, diagnosed in early 2008.  He made an attempt to return to the sport, but it was short lived. Langston owns a large multi-line motorcycle dealership in Perris, California. He is also a current television presenter for several motorcycle media outlets.

References

External links 
 Grant Langston home page

1982 births
Living people
Sportspeople from Durban
South African motocross riders
AMA Motocross Championship National Champions
Motorsport announcers